The Shire of Augusta Margaret River is a local government area in the south-west corner of the South West region of Western Australia, approximately  south of Perth.

Nearly half of Augusta Margaret River's land area is state forest or national park. National parks include Scott National Park and Leeuwin-Naturaliste National Park. Other land uses include agriculture, especially dairy and beef cattle; viticulture; and tourism.

History

It was first gazetted as the Augusta Road District on 16 April 1891 and was renamed to Augusta-Margaret River Road District on 10 September 1926. On 1 July 1961, it became a shire under the Local Government Act 1960.  In 2017 it abolished its system of wards for electing councillors.

Towns and localities
The towns and localities of the Shire of Augusta-Margaret River with population and size figures based on the most recent Australian census:

(* indicates locality is only partially located within this shire)

Notes

  Locality was created in 2021, the year of the census; no population data is available.

Population
The historical figures for the population of the shire have been recorded in the census as follows:

Notable councillors
 Barry Blaikie, Shire of Augusta-Margaret River councillor 1965–1971, later a state MP

Heritage-listed places

As of 2023, 143 places are heritage-listed in the Shire of Augusta-Margaret River, of which eleven are on the State Register of Heritage Places, among them the Cape Leeuwin Lighthouse, Wallcliffe House and Ellensbrook.

Map
 Western Australia. Dept. of Land Administration. Cartographic Services Branch. (2004) South West Corner/Western Australia  Perth, W.A.. Scale 1:150 000 ; (E 114°58'--E 115°40'/S 033°27'--S 034°25')  Also known as StreetSmart Touring Map - with localities Augusta, Busselton, Dunsborough and Margaret River  on title

References

Notes

Bibliography

External links
 

Augusta
Augusta, Western Australia
Cowaramup, Western Australia
Margaret River, Western Australia